The sleeper torpedo (Crassinarke dormitor) is a species of electric ray in the family Narkidae.  It is the only species in its genus. It occurs in relatively shallow water off the coasts of southern Japan, China and Taiwan. It may be the same species as the Japanese sleeper ray (Narke japonica)

References 

sleeper torpedo
Fish of Japan
Marine fauna of East Asia
sleeper torpedo
Strongly electric fish